The Bride Walks Out is a 1936 American romantic comedy film directed by Leigh Jason and starring Barbara Stanwyck, Gene Raymond, and Robert Young. Based on an original story by Howard Emmett Rogers, the film is about a woman forced to give up her job as a fashion model by her new husband. Unable to meet her financial obligations, the woman secretly gets another job. The Bride Walks Out was the first of six films Edward Small made at RKO.

Plot
Carolyn Martin has expensive tastes despite husband Michael not earning much money. They split up and she is wooed by a millionaire.

Cast
 Barbara Stanwyck as Carolyn Martin
 Gene Raymond as Michael Martin
 Robert Young as Hugh McKenzie
 Ned Sparks as Paul Dodson
 Helen Broderick as Mattie Dodson
 Willie Best as Smokie 
 Robert Warwick as Mr. McKenzie
 Billy Gilbert as Mr. Donovan 
 Wade Boteler as Field Engineer 
 Hattie McDaniel as Carolyn's Maid

Reception
The film made a profit of $164,000.

References

External links
 

1936 films
American black-and-white films
RKO Pictures films
Films produced by Edward Small
American romantic comedy films
1936 romantic comedy films
Films directed by Leigh Jason
1930s English-language films
1930s American films